Blackstone's Criminal Practice is a book about English criminal law. The First Edition was published by Blackstone Press in 1991. The Twenty-seventh Edition was published by Oxford University Press in 2016. In 2016, the Judicial Executive Board selected Blackstone's Criminal Practice 2017 as the principal practitioner text for all criminal courts in England and Wales.
The Editors in Chief are Professor David Ormerod KC and David Perry KC. David Ormerod was previously the joint editor (since 2008) with Lord Justice Hooper. 

It is one of the "main" books that lawyers practising on the criminal side use. The Crown Prosecution Service describe this book as a "standard source" and as a "recognised legal textbook", and say that the legal guidance given on their website is no substitute for a book such as this one. By 2002, it was the "leading" work for proceedings in the magistrates' courts.

References

Further reading
Hooper and Ormerod. Blackstone's Criminal Practice 2010. Supplement 3. 2010. Oxford University Press. Digitized copy. from Google Books. 
Hooper and Ormerod. Blackstone's Criminal Practice 2011. Supplement 1. 2010. Oxford University Press.  . Digitized copies from Google Books.
David Ormerod. Blackstone's Criminal Practice 2012. 2011. Oxford University Press. Digitized copy from Google Books.
Hooper and Ormerod. Blackstone's Criminal Practice 2012. Supplement 1. 2011. Oxford University Press. Digitized copy from Google Books.
Blackstone's Criminal Practice 2012. Supplement 2. 2012. Oxford University Press. Digitized copy. from Google Books.
Hooper and Ormerod . Blackstone's Criminal Practice 2012. Supplement 3. 2012. Oxford University Press. Digitized copy. from Google Books.
Blackstone's Criminal Practice 2017. Oxford University Press.

Law textbooks
English criminal law
1991 non-fiction books
Oxford University Press books